USS Emily was a Union steamer during the American Civil War. 

In October 1862, Emily fell under the jurisdiction of a Colonel Howard at Roanoke Island, whereat it was lent to Lieutenant Commander C. W. Flusser to ferry Union servicemen wounded in the Joint Expedition Against Franklin to Norfolk Hospital.  At some point in its service history, the steamer was captained by George Howland.

References

ships of the Union Navy
steamships of the United States Navy